Thomas Edmund Bourdillon (31 May 1890 – 27 May 1961) was an Orange Free State born Rhodesian cricketer. Bourdillon was a right-handed batsman who bowled right-arm fast-medium. He was born at Bloemfontein, Orange Free State, and was educated at Tonbridge School in England.

Bourdillon made his first-class debut for Rhodesia against HDG Leveson-Gower's XI, making two appearances against the touring team in 1910. A little over three years later, he made his next first-class appearance for PW Sherwell's XI against Transvaal, during which he scored his only first-class fifty with a score of 60. He later made a single first-class appearance for English county side Sussex in the 1919 County Championship against Somerset, scoring 28 runs in the match. Three further first-class appearances came later for Rhodesia, twice against Transvaal in 1923 and once against SB Joel's XI in 1924. In five first-class matches for Rhodesia, Bourdillon scored 78 runs at an average of 8.66, with a high score of 24. With the ball, he took 3 wickets at a bowling average of 57.66, with best figures of 2/51.

He died at Salisbury, Rhodesia on 27 May 1961. His brother, Victor, played first-class cricket, as did his grandson Paul Bourdillon.

References

External links
Thomas Bourdillon at ESPNcricinfo
Thomas Bourdillon at CricketArchive

1890 births
1961 deaths
South African emigrants to Rhodesia
Cricketers from Bloemfontein
People educated at Tonbridge School
Rhodesia cricketers
Sussex cricketers
Orange Free State people